Ideas and practices of nationality and citizenship in the Republic of Argentina (and before that, in the Viceroyalty of the Río de la Plata and the Inca Empire) have changed with distinct periods of its history, including but not limited to periods of indigenous, colonial, republican, and military rule. 

These periods, in which political rights were often denied to both citizens and non-citizens, encouraged the development of resistance movements. This history of resistance and fighting for political rights is deeply imbedded in the modern Argentine notion of citizenship.

Inca nationality 
The Inca Empire was a conglomeration of conquered ethnic groups - etnías - ruled by ethnic Inca from the Cuzco-Lake Titicaca Basin in what is now central Peru. They called their empire Tiwantinsuyu, meaning "four corners." Modern northern and western Argentina was a part of Kollasuyu. The Inca elite imposed their own institutions on conquered territories, while at the same time incorporating local customs on a case-by-case basis. Because the Argentine portion of Kollasuyu was on the edge of the empire the communities there had even more local autonomy than elsewhere in the empire, but were still subject to Inca protection and duties through the mita system of reciprocity. At the same time, Inca statebuilding was based on the threat of violence. 
This interplay of threat and promise, combined with the ethnic diversity of the conquered groups, created an Inca citizenship that was not ethnic but territorial and administrative, and based on a reciprocal relationship of rights and duties. Though citizens were ultimately loyal to their particular etnías and communities (ayllus), the Inca Empire's formal structures were a clear and unifying presence, even at its edges.

Mita

The Inca state functioned through a complex system of labour extraction and tribute which consolidated their power over conquered regions. This tribute always took the form of people and their time, and was couched in kinship terms.
Censuses were conducted using the quipu, and individual ethnic groups were assigned unique goods and public services to provide as their tax. In return, citizens received immediate rewards (like feasts), as well as the promise that their ayllus would be provided  protection from enemies and food if, for example, their harvests failed.

Other expressions of Inca presence
 The spoken language of Quechua was the official spoken language of all governance (the Inca had no written language), and became a symbol of Inca presence through contact with officials and the renaming of local landmarks.
 Imperial, administrative titles were given to local officials and ethnic/ayllu leaders, thus incorporating them into the empire's broader, administrative structure.
 As mentioned, the Inca conducted detailed censuses using the quipu. Inclusion on the census made one, officially, an Inca subject.
 The Inca resettled conquered peoples for a variety of administrative reasons. Often, the moving of these mitmaqkuna settlers was purely an expression of power over newly conquered subjects.

Colonisation and the Viceroyalty 
After being colonised by the Spanish, Argentina was made part of the Viceroyalty of Peru. In 1776 it became part of the new, and ultimately short-lived, Viceroyalty of the Río de la Plata. Throughout Spanish America, citizenship was both a legal and a social status that was implicit rather than formal, and largely informed by one's racial and class background. As in the Inca Empire, the colonising power's concepts were combined with the unique dictates of the situation in the colony itself.

Vecindad

Vecino was the blanket term for community member in Spain and colonial and independent Spanish America, and is rather more extensive than the modern "citizen", implying ownership of property and respectability. The criteria for being a vecino were never defined in legislation, but rather conceived of as a natural, general rule. It is a nuanced, personal status directly related to a person's standing within the community. Shaped by the conditions in the colony, the term took on a broader meaning in the Americas than it had in Spain itself, where citizenship and nationality were not concerns for most, and where the racial makeup was more homogenous.

Naturaleza
Naturaleza, meaning "naturaleness" or "nativeness," was a second term for citizenship in Spain and Spanish America. It usually applied to "natives of the kingdoms of Spain," and was more closely linked to the Crown and subjecthood. Like vecindad, naturaleza was never clearly defined in the law, and took on a broader meaning than in Spain itself.

Casta system 
The Casta system of racial classification was the foundation of social order, and thus rights, throughout Spanish America.

Peninsulares, Criollo (people)s, Indios, and the growing group of mixed-race inhabitants (usually mestizos) all had different citizenship rights. Peninsulares had the full rights and privileges of naturaleza, and were the most esteemed in society and therefore were the ideal vecinos. Criollos were the most common in Buenos Aires, and were naturales and vecinos too, though with an implicitly lower status. Indios and mestizos were, initially, excluded from citizenship status entirely.

Immigration and the foreigner 
The presence of non-Spanish Europeans in the Viceroyalties of Peru and Rio de La Plata was, officially, illegal. Though “insiders” and “outsiders” were not explicitly defined in the viceroyalties, Spanish law did differentiate between the two by granting privileges only to those considered members of the community. Because the concept of ‘community’ itself was poorly, if at all defined, non-members were deemed to be so on a case-by-case basis, based on community opinion and, where available, on precedent.
In order to become a member of the community, an outsider usually needed to prove that he was born in the territory, and culturally Spanish (Spanish speaking and writing, Catholic, etc.). In this way Spanish America tended towards jus soli (right by birthplace). Foreigners could apply to the audiencia for a license to remain in the viceroyalty, or they could apply to the Crown (through the Council of the Indies  for naturalization. The former did not grant the foreigner any rights, while the latter carta de naturaleza granted most rights afforded to other members (with some exceptions, including the right to own and operate a business).
Obtaining the  carta de naturaleza was a lengthier process requiring more proof of cultural Spanishness, and usually a monetary payment to a Crown office or official. It was considered a personal grant, and therefore a personal relationship with a Crown official was invaluable.

Early Buenos Aires
Colonial Buenos Aires was a relatively small frontier settlement threatened by the indigenous and Portuguese presence in the area, which gave the city's residents an especially acute sense of their Spanishness. To this end, city officials only allowed "natives of the kingdoms of Spain" (naturales) to become citizens. Only foreigners who could provide a useful service to the city and who were considered culturally Spanish were granted the status. These individuals were almost always of non-Spanish European ancestry, and where rarely (if ever) indigenous or African. 
In the 1610s, an oath for citizenship candidates was created that required them to possess a house and arms; however, the number of applicants dropped in subsequent years and the oath fell out of use.

The Indians
By the eighteenth century, Indians were receiving citizenship statuses of their own. Initially classified as members of indigenous communities by birth, this status helped determine their labour (repartimiento) and taxation (tributo) duties to the Crown.  Still, the terms vecino and naturaleza were never officially applied.

Criollo versus Peninsular
The implicit valuing of peninsulares over criollos in Spanish America was a key point of contention in the debates over independence, particularly in the highly-literate city of Buenos Aires. Though they legally belonged to the same kingdom as naturalezas, only criollos had been born in the Americas (as vecinos), and thus felt that they had a unique claim to the land, its administration, and the rights that would follow.

Independence  and the new Republic 
The Independence movement in Argentina was primarily criollo movement, and thus the citizenship laws made in its aftermath primarily affected the criollo population.
( A notable exception: The Asamblea del Año XIII, or Assembly of 1813, precursed the official Argentine Declaration of Independence in July 1816, but is the republic's first attempt at a constitution. Though the delegates could not agree on many major points, Freedom of Wombs was declared, giving freedom and citizenship to slaves' children born within the territory. It also states that the Argentine Indians were ruled by the Pampas in the 1800s.)

Generation of 1830 
Led by Domingo Faustino Sarmiento, Juan Bautista Alberdi, and Esteban Echeverria in response to the Rosas administration, the Generation of 1830 proposed a new, modern Argentina built on economic partnerships with Europe and European immigrants. Sarmiento's “civilization or barbarism” and Alberdi's “civil liberty for all, political liberty for a few” and "to rule is to populate" characterize the society they envisioned – one of order and progress, in which those qualified to run the state were men of European intellectual tradition. This more elitist approach to governance effectively proposed two tiers of citizenship.

Exclusion in the “New Country” 
No matter how close economic and cultural ties were (or were desired to be) with Europe, political discourse in the mid-nineteenth century up to Peronism after the Second World War made Europeans the counterpoint “other” to Argentine collective identity. Argentina was developing on the same economically liberal  model as European powers (particularly Spain, Britain, and France), but improving on it.

Constitution of 1853 
The Argentine Constitution of 1853, the new republic's first constitution, does not contain any explicit references to citizenship, though as a product of its framers liberal thought it is very universalist in spirit, speaking of broad, universal rights that apply to all men. This contrasts with the practice of vecindad, which is by nature individual and nuanced.

Immigration in the Nineteenth and Early Twentieth Centuries

The Constitution of 1853 did include a clause regarding immigration: 

This clause reflects the Generation of 1830s immigration policies. European immigrants, particularly those from developed Northern European countries, were meant to have a civilizing and modernizing effect on Argentine society, and to forge a new Argentine identity based on hard work, merit, and economic progress.

Populating the Interior
Along with changing the demographic makeup of the country by increasing the number of Europeans, the immigration drives of the nineteenth and early twentieth century were meant to populate the Argentine interior which was, to this point, largely undeveloped.

These two aims - Europeanization and population of the interior - combined in the Conquest of the Desert, where the remaining indigenous groups of the pampas, Andes valleys, and Patagonia were driven out or killed to make room for immigrant farmers. The indigenous were considered a problem, and not true Argentines in the new vision, and therefore had no citizenship rights in the first place.

Immigration Law
 Ley de Desembarco (Law of Disembarkment), 1872 – Containing the first legal definition of ‘immigrant,’ the law allowed inspection of ships to prevent the entry of those ill or otherwise unable to work. The bill did not pass the Committee on Legislation, but was reworked and included in an 1876 law after an outbreak of yellow fever on an immigrant ship spread throughout Buenos Aires.
Ley de Residencia (Law of Residence), 1902 - Legalised the expulsion of immigrants who "compromise national security or disturb public order."
Ley de Seguridad Social (Law of Social Security), 1910 – This law provided for the expulsion of anarchists and persons convicted of capital crimes in Argentina. It was also established for ship captains who allowed passengers to violate the law. It represents a further backlash against the immigration population. Membership in the Argentine nation was still contingent on being useful to it.

Perón and a new collective identity
Juan Perón’s populist, participatory government encouraged a greater link between subject and state. His vision was inclusive and collective, based on the idea that all of Argentina needed to be involved in the project of national development. Ethnic, racial, or other national identities were made secondary to the new collective Argentine identity. He was the first to frame Argentine citizenship in terms of political rights, rather than community membership.

Enfranchisement and political participation
Peron, with the influence of his wife Eva Peron (Evita), officially enfranchised women and involved the lower classes, particularly workers, in national politics for the first time. Through their social welfare programs, Peron and Evita became father and mother figures for the Argentine masses, building a collective national identity instead of a country of sovereign individuals.

Building the collective identity
Peron built his new Argentine identity around its Hispanic and creole roots and the concept of the Madre Patria (motherland) to which one is always, and ultimately, loyal. Later, this Hispanic tradition was replaced by a Latin one in order to incorporate the large Italian immigrant community. Public holidays like the ‘’Día de la Raza’’ and new school textbooks glorified the conquest.

He also encouraged immigrant and minority groups, especially Jews, to participate in public life through labour unions, officially recognized cultural associations and wings of political parties.

Peron's initially successful economic policy of Import substitution industrialization (ISI) also fostered national pride and a sense of independence.

Guerra Sucia and Military Rule
The military juntas and the Guerra Sucia which followed Peron were exceptionally repressive, and the systematic targeting of ordinary citizens created a climate of fear and silence that was the opposite of the mass political participation of the Peron era. Still, they too built their governments around concepts of Argentine identity. The juntas attacked Peronism as a threat to the true capitalist Argentine values, conceiving a more, individualist, and exclusive model of citizenship in which only the qualified had the right to rule, and all others must trust their decisions. The collective Argentine identity was replaced with a more individualist, favour-based model, where the citizen's role was in service of the state rather than vice versa

Social movements
Though freedom of expression was nonexistent under the juntas and dissent was a punishable offence, a strong social movement grew out of the military rule. Though each group had its own concerns, most used the rhetoric of citizenship to fight for a return of their political rights. These human rights groups were eventually joined by women's groups and trade unions in early 1982, beginning the return to democracy and civilian rule. By voicing their concerns in terms of citizenship rights, the dissent movement refashioned the model of the Argentine citizen into one of an active participator with high expectations, willing to make demands of his or her government.

Present day 
Present day Argentine citizenship law is derived, in the most part, from the National Constitution. Until recently, in 1994, the document did not contain any definition of citizenship and the related rights; instead, clauses were worded in terms of "residents" and "the people." The 'New Rights and Guarantees' section added in 1994 was a reaction to authoritarian rule, and clearly regulates Argentine political rights; however, the Constitution still does not contain a definition of citizenship itself.

Relevant sections of the Constitution 

In this way, Argentina's federal system uses a version of the principle of comity to uphold provinces' rights, while still maintaining that Argentine citizenship is a national, pan-provincial status.

Section 14bis also includes a provision granting the benefits of social security, "which shall be of an integral nature and may not be waived."
Argentina extends its civil rights to "all inhabitants" of the Nation, not just those with full citizenship status. (see "section 20" below) This provision was added in 1957, with the state taking responsibility for its inhabitants' well-being.

This section is a reaction to Spanish colonial rule, under which an individual's legal and practical rights were determined by their blood (both in terms of race and nobility).
The stipulation that "equality is the basis of taxation and public burdens" reflects that, in practice, Argentine citizenship flows from both rights and duties.

Citizenship 
The valid laws governing citizenship (Ley 346, Ley 23.059, and Decreto 3.213/84) set forth very simple requirements:

(1) to be 18 years old;

(2) to have been living in Argentina for 2 years; and

(3) to apply for citizenship before a federal judge.

And it can be denied if you:

(1) have been in jail for more than 3 year in the last 5 years;

(2) are under criminal prosecution;

(3) do not have an honest way of income. To work without a legal permit is considered an honest way of living.

Due to the fact that the citizenship law has existed unchanged since 1869 in its present form, the Supreme Court have issued many precedents on which there is a solution to almost every immigration situation an immigrant might face. Citizenship has been granted to immigrants who lacked legal residency or entered the country illegally, or even to immigrants with criminal records in exceptional cases.

Recently, the Federal Chamber of Parana established that illegals doesn't exist in Argentina. Illegality is regarding actions that violates the criminal law. The violation of the immigration law is a simple administrative issue that can be healed applying for residency or citizenship.

The continuous 2 years means that you have your home in this country. Foreigners have the same civil rights than Argentines, among others, to travel. It means that the continuity of the 2 years doesn't mean that the solicitant cannot leave the country.

For historic reasons, federal courts are still reluctant to recognize the rights of ¨irregular¨ immigrants, They usually request the following requirements related to the abolished law 21.795 (enacted in 1978 by Dictator Jorge Rafael Videla, was abolished in 1984 and Law 346 re-enacted):

(1) Legal residency (2) Legal work (3) That you speak, read and write Spanish (4) That you renounce your native citizenship (5) DNI with permanent residency (6) Birth certificate apostilled and translated by public notary (7) Certificate of a clean criminal record from your home country (8) Certificate of a clean criminal record in Argentina (9) CUIT or CUIL number

Documento Nacional de Identidad 
The DNI is Argentina's Documento Nacional de Identidad, or National Identity Document. It is a small book of personal information that includes a unique number, used to obtain social services, to vote, in renting, opening bank accounts, etc.

New residents are legally required to obtain a DNI within 90 days of arrival.

Elections 
As mentioned in Section 37, Argentina enforces compulsory voting - it is both a right and a duty.

Though non-citizens cannot vote in federal elections, some provinces allow non-citizen residents (those with DNIs) to vote in provincial and/or municipal elections:
Buenos Aires (province) - provincial and municipal
Buenos Aires (city)-  local only
Catamarca - municipal only, with DNI and four years' residence in Catamarca and having registered with the municipal authorities as a foreign voter
Misiones - provincial and municipal, having registered specially with and obtained a voters' card from the provincial authorities
Neuquén - provincial and municipal, having registered specially with provincial authorities
Santa Fe - municipal intendents and councilpersons only, having registered specially with municipal and provincial authorities

See also 
Pre-Columbian America
Demographics of Argentina
Immigration to Argentina
History of the Jews in Argentina
Afro Argentine
Welsh settlement in Argentina
Asian-Argentines

Notes 

Argentine
Social history of Argentina